The 1980 North Dakota gubernatorial election was held on November 4, 1980. Republican nominee Allen I. Olson defeated Democratic-NPL incumbent Arthur A. Link with 53.61% of the vote.

Primary elections
Primary elections were held on September 2, 1980.

Democratic primary

Candidates
Arthur A. Link, incumbent Governor

Results

Republican primary

Candidates
Allen I. Olson, North Dakota Attorney General
Orville W. Hagen, former Lieutenant Governor

Results

General election

Candidates
Allen I. Olson, Republican
Arthur A. Link, Democratic

Results

References

1980
North Dakota
Gubernatorial